Elections to Rugby Borough Council took place on Thursday 3 May 2012.

All 42 seats were up for election. This is because a boundary review took place and reduced the size of the council and adjusted the ward boundaries. The Conservative Party retained their majority.

New Wards
Admirals & Cawston Ward (3 councillors)
Benn Ward (3 councillors)
Bilton Ward (3 councillors)
Clifton, Newton and Churchover Ward (1 councillor)
Coton and Boughton Ward (3 councillors)
Dunsmore Ward (3 councillors)
Eastlands Ward (3 councillors)
Hillmorton Ward (3 councillors)
Leam Valley Ward (1 councillor)
New Bilton Ward (3 councillors)
Newbold and Brownsover Ward (3 councillors)
Paddox Ward (3 councillors)
Revel and Binley Woods Ward (3 councillors)
Rokeby and Overslade Ward (3 councillors)
Wolston and the Lawfords Ward (3 councillors)
Wolvey and Shilton Ward (1 councillor)

Election results

Ward Results
Note: Because of the boundary changes and the lack of any nominal results under the new boundaries, all results are listed as holds, even when seats have de facto changed hands. Percentage results are only shown for single-seat wards.

References

2012 English local elections
2012
2010s in Warwickshire